Four Women is a 1975 short experimental film produced and directed by Julie Dash featuring music by Nina Simone.

Summary
Dancer Linda Martina Young captures the spirit of four women: Aunt Sarah, Saffronia, Sweet Thing and Peaches to the Nina Simone ballad Four Women. The women represent stereotypes of black women as they attempt to survive in America.

Production
Linda Martina Young choreographed the dance performance, which Dash refers to as a "choreopoem".

The film is celebrated as one of the first experimental films by a black woman filmmaker. The film, unlike others that portrayed the positive aspects of black womanhood, explored the negative realities many black women face in America.

Restoration
In addition to the original 16mm rolls, a new print was created from the color negative A/B rolls and original track negative.

Screenings
 Cinema Remixed and Reloaded Exhibit, Spelman College Museum of Fine Art, 2007
 One Way or Another: Black Women's Cinema, BAMcinematek, 2016
 L.A. Rebellion: Creating a New Black Cinema Exhibit
 We Wanted a Revolution: :Black Radical Women, 1965-1985, Brooklyn Museum, 2017.

References